Pseudomurex is a genus of sea snails, marine gastropod mollusks in the family Muricidae, the murex snails or rock snails.

This genus has become a synonym of Coralliophila H. Adams & A. Adams, 1853

Species
Species within the genus Pseudomurex include:

 Pseudomurex spadae Libassi, 1859

References

Muricinae